Paradise Hills is a census-designated place (CDP) in Bernalillo County, New Mexico, United States. The population was 4,256 at the 2010 census. It is part of the Albuquerque Metropolitan Statistical Area.

Geography
Paradise Hills is located in northern Bernalillo County on high ground rising to the west of the valley of the Rio Grande. The unincorporated CDP is entirely surrounded by the city of Albuquerque. Paradise Hills is bordered to the east by the Desert Greens Golf Course, formerly known as Paradise Hills Golf Course.

Demographics

Education
It is zoned to Albuquerque Public Schools.

Notable events 
Kirk Douglas' film production company, Joel Productions, filmed the movie Lonely Are the Brave on location in Paradise Hills. The film began shooting on May 1, 1961, at which time the land was managed by Horizon Land Corporation, a Tucson-based company.

References

Census-designated places in Bernalillo County, New Mexico
Census-designated places in New Mexico
Albuquerque metropolitan area